WZUU (92.5 FM, "The ZUU [Zoo]") is a radio station broadcasting a mainstream rock format.  Licensed to Mattawan, Michigan, it first began broadcasting in 1990 under the WKGH call sign.  During the first few years of the radio station, it broadcast oldies from a satellite feed.  On Memorial Day 1995, the station began to broadcast an alternative and modern rock-styled format.  The station changed frequency from 92.3 to 92.5 and increased its power.  This change was made effective Friday, January 12, 2007 at 4pm.

Bronco Radio Network
Prior to relocating it was an affiliate of the "Bronco Radio Network" for Western Michigan University. From the fall of 2007 to spring of 2010, it was the flagship station for Broncos football and men's basketball.

References
Michiguide.com - WZUU History

External links

ZUU
Radio stations established in 1990